Molybdenum dioxide is the chemical compound with the formula MoO. It is a violet-colored solid and is a metallic conductor. The mineralogical form of this compound is called tugarinovite, and is only very rarely found.

Structure
It crystallizes in a monoclinic cell, and has a distorted rutile, (TiO2) crystal structure. In TiO the oxide anions are close packed and titanium atoms occupy half of the octahedral interstices (holes). In MoO the octahedra are distorted, the Mo atoms are off-centre, leading to alternating short and long Mo – Mo distances and Mo-Mo bonding. The short Mo – Mo distance is 251 pm which is less than the Mo – Mo distance in the metal, 272.5 pm. The bond length is shorter than would be expected for a single bond. The bonding is complex and involves a delocalisation of some of the Mo electrons in a conductance band accounting for the metallic conductivity.

Preparation
MoO can be prepared :
The tungsten analogue, WO, is prepared similarly.
2 MoO  +  Mo → 3 MoO
by reducing MoO with H2 or NH3 below  

Single crystals are obtained by chemical transport using iodine.  Iodine reversibly converts MoO2 into the volatile species MoOI.

Uses
Molybdenum dioxide is a constituent of "technical molybdenum trioxide" produced during the industrial processing of MoS2:

2 MoS + 7 O → 2 MoO + 4 SO
MoS + 6 MoO → 7 MoO + 2 SO
2 MoO + O → 2 MoO

MoO has been reported as catalysing the dehydrogenation of alcohols, the reformation of hydrocarbons and biodiesel. Molybdenum nano-wires have been produced by reducing MoO deposited on graphite. Molybdenum dioxide has also been suggested as possible anode material for Li-ion batteries.

References

molybdenum(IV) compounds
transition metal oxides